McCauley Mountain may refer to:

McCauley Mountain (New York), a ski resort in New York
McCauley Mountain (Webb, New York), an elevation in Herkimer County, New York
McCauley Mountain (Pennsylvania), a mountain in Pennsylvania

See also
McCauley (disambiguation)